Julienne Davis (born September 26, 1973) is an American actress, singer, and model. She was born in Los Angeles, California.

Early life 
Davis was born on September 26, 1973, in Los Angeles. When she was seventeen, she left home to pursue a career in classical ballet in New York but after finding she was too tall to audition for corps de ballet she decided to become a fashion model instead. She is half Yankton Sioux.

Career 
Her acting credits include the role of "Mandy" in Eyes Wide Shut, Tabloid, House of 9, and The Bill, as well as being a main cast member of the television series Too Much Sun. She also appeared in an advertisement for Carling beer. Prior to acting, she worked as a fashion model for print, editorial, and catalogues, most notably for Gossard Bras and the Pirelli Calendar. Davis is co-writer, co-producer, and lead vocalist for the band Sophisticated Savage.

Filmography 
Film
{| class="wikitable"
|-
! Year !! Title !! Role(s) !! Director !! Notes
|-
| 1999 || Eyes Wide Shut || Amanda 'Mandy' Curran || Stanley Kubrick || Feature film debut
|-
| 2001 || Tabloid  || TV Show Hostess || David Blair  || Credited as Trolley Gardner
|-
| 2005 || House of 9 || Cynthia || Steven R. Monroe || 
|-
| 2010 || Breathe || Detective Toni Foster || Lonny Stevens || Short film
|-
| 2014 || The Session || Renee Stratton || Laura Russo || Short film
|-
| 2015 || ''Guilt Trippin || Woman || Laura Russo || Short film
|-
| 2016 || Going Together || Melinda || Sophie Webb || Short film
|}Television'''

References

External links 
 
 
 Sophisticated Savage site

1973 births
Actresses from Los Angeles
American film actresses
Female models from California
Living people
Native American actresses
Yankton Dakota people
21st-century American singers
21st-century American women singers